Birgit Minichmayr (born 3 April 1977) is an Austrian actress born in Linz, Austria. She studied drama at the Max Reinhardt Seminar in Vienna. For her work in Maren Ade's film Everyone Else she won Silver Bear for Best Actress at 59th Berlin International Film Festival. She is the only Austrian actress to win this award in history of the festival and the first Austrian actress to win best actress award at a major European film festival (Cannes, Venice, Berlin) since 1956. She worked with several major European directors including Michael Haneke, Tom Tykwer and Jessica Hausner.

Career
Minichmayr had her first break with the Burgtheater in Vienna, where she appeared in numerous plays, including Der Reigen by Arthur Schnitzler (staged by Sven-Eric Bechtolf), Troilus and Cressida by William Shakespeare (staging by Declan Donnellan) and Der Färber und sein Zwillingsbruder by Johann Nestroy (staged by Karlheinz Hackl). She made her cinema debut in 2000 as Barbara Brecht in Jan Schütte's Abschied, playing alongside Josef Bierbichler and Monica Bleibtreu. In 2000,  Minichmayr appeared in Peter Sämann's television thriller (in the Tatort series), "Böses Blut". She was awarded the Austrian Nestroy Prize for "Best Young Talent" in 2000. In 2006 she played Mizzi Kasper, one of the lovers from Crownprince Rudolf in the movie . A year later, Minichmayr played the fool in Luc Bondy's acclaimed staging of Shakespeare's King Lear, always at the Burgtheater.

Minichmayr currently lives in Munich and Vienna. She speaks English and has acted in several international and English language productions. Among the directors she worked with were István Szabó, Götz Spielmann, Tom Tykwer, Oliver Hirschbiegel, Robert Dornhelm, and Doris Dörrie.  She is also an accomplished vocalist, and has been recorded several times, though she has always made acting her primary focus.

At the 59th Berlin International Film Festival 2009 Minichmayr was awarded the Silver Bear for Best Actress for her performance in Maren Ade's Alle Anderen (Everyone Else).

Filmography

Awards
 2000: Nestroy Prize for Best Young Talent
 2004/2009: Nestroy Prize for Best Actress
 2009: 59th Berlin International Film Festival, Best Actress for Everyone Else
 2010: German Film Awards, Nomination Best Actress for Everyone Else
 2015: Blow-Up International Arthouse Film Festival, Nomination for Best Actress - Monica Vitti Award

References

External links

Austrian film actresses
1977 births
Actors from Linz
Living people
Shakespearean actresses
Austrian stage actresses
Silver Bear for Best Actress winners
21st-century Austrian actresses
21st-century Austrian women singers
Austrian television actresses